St. Matthew's High School may refer to:
St. Matthew's High School, Keiskammahoek, Eastern Cape, South Africa
St. Matthew's High School, Conshohocken Pennsylvania, United States
St. Matthew's High School, Flint, Michigan, United States
St. Matthew's High School, Melrose, Louisiana, United States